Preben Van Hecke (born 9 July 1982 in Dendermonde) is a Belgian former professional road bicycle racer, who competed professionally between 2004 and 2019 for the ,  and . He won the Belgian National Road Race Championships in 2015, out of a two-man breakaway with Jürgen Roelandts.

He now works as a directeur sportif for UCI WorldTeam .

Major results
Source: 

2002
 6th Boucle de l'Artois
 7th Flèche Ardennaise
2003
 1st Omloop Het Volk U23
 1st Circuit du Hainaut
 1st Stage 6 Tour de Normandie
 6th Zellik–Galmaarden
 9th Flèche Ardennaise
2004
 1st Noord Nederland Tour
 Ster Elektrotoer
1st Mountains classification
1st Stage 2
 7th Overall Tour de la Région Wallonne
2005
 8th Overall Tour de l'Ain
2006
 1st Schaal Sels
 2nd Overall Étoile de Bessèges
 6th Nationale Sluitingsprijs
 9th Grand Prix Pino Cerami
2007
 3rd Overall Étoile de Bessèges
 4th Hel van het Mergelland
2008
 2nd Grote Prijs Stad Zottegem
 10th Grand Prix of Aargau Canton
 10th Schaal Sels
2010
 3rd Druivenkoers Overijse
 9th Hel van het Mergelland
2012
 1st Omloop van het Waasland
 1st Mountains classification, Tour of Slovenia
2013
 1st Antwerpse Havenpijl
 1st Grand Prix de la Somme
2015
 1st  Road race, National Road Championships
 3rd Dwars door de Vlaamse Ardennen
2016
 7th Overall Arctic Race of Norway
2017
 1st  Mountains classification, Tour of Norway
 7th Druivenkoers Overijse
 8th Dorpenomloop Rucphen
2018
 1st  Mountains classification, Volta a la Comunitat Valenciana
 3rd Ronde van Drenthe
 3rd Great War Remembrance Race

References

External links
 
 
 

1982 births
Living people
People from Dendermonde
Belgian male cyclists
Cyclists from East Flanders
Directeur sportifs